Thomas Crichton Wilson (born 18 November 1936) is an English former first-class cricketer.

Educated at Eastbourne College, Wilson played a single first-class cricket match for L. C. Stevens' XI against Cambridge University at Eastbourne in 1960. He took one wicket in the match with his right-arm medium-fast bowling, dismissing Michael Willard in the Cambridge first-innings, taking figures of 1 for 42 across the match.

References

External links

1936 births
Living people
Sportspeople from Eastbourne
People educated at Eastbourne College
English cricketers
L. C. Stevens' XI cricketers